Idaho County Airport  is a county-owned, public-use airport in Idaho County, Idaho. It is located one nautical mile (1.15 mi, 1.85 km) north of the central business district of Grangeville, Idaho.

Although most U.S. airports use the same three-letter location identifier for the FAA and IATA, this airport is assigned GIC by the FAA and IDH by the IATA (which assigned GIC to Boigu Island Airport in Queensland, Australia).

Facilities and aircraft 
It has one runway designated 7/25 with an asphalt surface measuring 5,101 by 75 feet (1,555 x 23 m).

For the 12-month period ending on March 19, 2010, the airport had 13,000 aircraft operations, an average of 35 per day: 81% general aviation and 19% air taxi. At that time, there were 14 aircraft based at this airport: 13 single-engine and 1 ultralight.

References

External links 
 Aerial photo as of 16 July 1998 from USGS The National Map
 

Airports in Idaho
Transportation in Idaho County, Idaho